Sudus is a genus of hidden snout weevils in the beetle family Curculionidae. There is one described species in Sudus, S. floridanus.

References

Further reading

 
 
 

Cryptorhynchinae
Articles created by Qbugbot